The Carson Valley Times (CVT) was an American daily online newspaper and group of journalistic publications, published in Gardnerville, Nevada from July 2013 through September 2017. It was one of three newspapers published in the Carson Valley along with the Record-Courier and the Sierra Scoop. It was a member of the Nevada Press Association.

The publication focused on visual imagery, human interest stories and pieces on the inner workings of area events and organizations. It covered Gardnerville, Minden, and Genoa, Nevada, as well as the surrounding Sierra Nevada region.

Publications
 CarsonValleyTimes.com Online – local news, sports & entertainment
 Carson Valley Living – lifestyle features magazine
 GameDay – weekly sports magazine

History
The Carson Valley Times was founded by journalist Joey Crandall in July 2013 after leaving a 10-year career at the Gardnerville-based Record-Courier newspaper.

It received several Nevada Press Association Awards in 2015, including Best Web Site, Community division; Best News Photo Coverage, Community division (Ron Harpin); Best Sports Photo (Ron Harpin); Best Sports Feature, Community division (Joey Crandall) and Best In-depth/Investigative Series, Community division (Scott Neuffer).

References

Newspapers published in Nevada
American news websites